Alive at Red Rocks is a live DVD and bonus CD by the American band Incubus. It was recorded in Red Rocks, Colorado on July 26, 2004. It was the first DVD showing new bassist Ben Kenney (Dirk Lance's replacement). It was also the first DVD that featured Mike Einziger using a Fender Rhodes piano, on the performances of "Here in My Room" and "Drive."

The bonus CD included five previously unreleased tracks. One was the popular live song "Pantomime", which was recorded for A Crow Left of the Murder..., but ultimately left off. "Monuments and Melodies", a B-side of the "Megalomaniac" single and Japanese bonus track of A Crow Left of the Murder..., was also released. A new version of the song called "Follow" (the previous version being a movement from The Odyssey, featured on the Halo 2 Original Soundtrack) was included. Finally, there are live performances of the songs "Circles" and "Are You In" on the CD.

DVD track listing
 "Megalomaniac"
 "Nice To Know You"
 "Idiot Box"
 "Just A Phase"
 "Priceless"
 "Beware! Criminal"
 "Wish You Were Here"
 "Here In My Room"
 "Drive"
 "Vitamin" (includes "Everything in Ebb," a portion of the "4th Movement of The Odyssey" with lyrics)
 "Pistola"
 "Stellar" (includes a portion of "De Do Do Do, De Da Da Da" by The Police)
 "Made For TV Movie"
 "Talk Shows on Mute"
 "Sick Sad Little World"
 "A Certain Shade of Green" (listed as just "Green" on the DVD)
 "Pantomime"
 "The Warmth"
 "Pardon Me"

CD track listing
 "Pantomime" (in-studio version) – 3:54
 "Follow" (vocal version of the first movement of The Odyssey) – 3:35
 "Monuments and Melodies" – 5:05
 "Are You In?" (live) – 4:30
 "Circles" (live) – 4:52

Personnel

Incubus
Brandon Boyd – lead vocals, rhythm guitar, percussion
Michael Einziger – lead guitar, rhodes piano, backing vocals
Jose Pasillas II – drums, percussion
Chris Kilmore – turntables, theremin
Ben Kenney – bass guitar, backing vocals, drums, percussion

Certifications

References

Incubus (band) albums
Incubus (band) video albums
2004 video albums
Live video albums
2004 live albums
Epic Records live albums
Epic Records video albums
Immortal Records live albums
Immortal Records video albums
Albums recorded at Red Rocks Amphitheatre